North Star Roller Derby (NSRD) is a non-profit women's flat track roller derby league based in Minneapolis, Minnesota. North Star plays its home games at the Warner Coliseum, and is a member of the Women's Flat Track Derby Association (WFTDA).

In June 2017, the league announced it had updated its name from "North Star Roller Girls" to "North Star Roller Derby".

Organization and teams

North Star Roller Derby was formed in June 2006 from the former TC Rollers organization. North Star is a Limited Liability Company (LLC), formed pursuant to the laws of the State of Minnesota. Skaters are not paid to play, and referees, announcers, and support staff are all volunteers. North Star is committed to partnering with local businesses and charitable organizations in an effort to strengthen and support the community at large.

North Star Roller Derby has four home teams: the Banger Sisters, Delta Delta Di, Kilmores, and the Violent Femmes. North Star also fields two traveling teams which compete against teams from other leagues, the Supernovas and the Northern Lights, composed of skaters from all four league teams.

2015-2016 home season results

2013-2014 home season results

2012-2013 home season results

2013 interleague season results
North Star Roller Derby supports two interleague travel teams. The WFTDA Charter team, the Supernovas, bout to maintain eligibility for WFTDA rankings and tournaments. The B-team, the Northern Lights, competes against other B-level teams in bouts and tournaments that maintain and support athletic development although they do not count for rankings. Both travel teams work and train together.

Additional game records and stats are available at Flat Track Stats.

Additional game records and stats are available at Flat Track Stats.

WFTDA competition

In sanctioned WFTDA play, North Star is represented by the Supernovas. North Star first competed at WFTDA Playoffs at the 2009 WFTDA North Central Regional Tournament, entering as the eighth seed and finishing in fifth place with an 85-43 victory over Arch Rival Roller Girls from St. Louis. In 2010, North Star returned to the regional playoff as the sixth seed, and finished in seventh place, capped by a 138-84 win over the Brewcity Bruisers of Milwaukee.

Rankings
WFTDA Member leagues are ranked internationally. Leagues are ranked six times per year, on a bi-monthly basis.

References

External links 
 North Star Roller Derby - North Star Roller Derby official website
 North Star Roller Girls PBWorks - Archives - Rosters, Results

Roller derby leagues established in 2006
Sports in Minneapolis
Women's sports in the United States
Roller derby leagues in Minnesota
2006 establishments in Minnesota